Pokémon Detective Pikachu (Original Motion Picture Soundtrack) is the score album to the 2019 film Pokémon Detective Pikachu, based on the Pokémon franchise, and the loose adaptation of the 2016 video game Detective Pikachu. The score, composed by Henry Jackman, featured 27 tracks and was released digitally by WaterTower Music and Sony Classical Records on May 8, 2019, and in physical formats on May 10, coinciding with the film's United States theatrical release. The film also features an original single "Carry On" by Kygo and Rita Ora, served as the standalone track and not featured in the score album, it was independently released by RCA Records on April 19. The score is included as a part of Jackman's score catalog acquired by Reservoir Media in March 2022.

Development 
Henry Jackman composed the film's score, in his third collaboration with Rob Letterman on Monsters vs. Aliens (2009) and Gulliver's Travels (2010). He called the music writing process as "immensely fun" and further added "The film itself was a unique invitation to create a new musical world representing all the wonderful and colorful characters of the Pokémon universe. I really enjoyed using many different sonic colors so, if you listen carefully, you can hear everything from the full symphony orchestra to analog vintage synths", although Bustle called the soundtrack as "heavy on electronic dance music". Letterman helped Jackman to bring his Roland TR-808 drum machine for the film score, but they could not use it as it "was faulty and damaged". Besides composing the score, Jackman arranged Junichi Masuda's "Red & Blue Theme" (used from previous Pokémon media) for the film's end credits, but was not included in the score soundtrack.

Kygo and Rita Ora released a standalone single for the film, titled "Carry On". The song and its accompanying music video were released on April 19, 2019. A remixed version of the song, is performed by  Dutch DJ Nicky Romero. Honest Boyz also collaborated with Lil Uzi Vert to make another song for the film, titled "Electricity" and produced by Pharrell Williams, which also plays over the end credits. Reservoir Media acquired all of Jackman's score in March 2022, including his work for Detective Pikachu.

Track listing 
Credits adapted from Tidal.

Additional music 
Additional songs that were played in the film, are "Le Fantôme de Saint Bechet" performed by Glenn Crytzer's Savoy Seven, "Payin No Mind" by Glen Crytzer And His Syncopaters, "GOH" featuring What So Not, Skrillex and KLP, "Kyoto Mist" by David Wahler, "Jigglypuff" by Rachel Lillis and the Pokémon main theme "Gotta Catch 'Em All", performed by Ryan Reynolds.

Reception 
Casey Cipriani, writing for Bustle, called the soundtrack as "fun and boppy" while also adding "it keeps you in Ryme City long after you leave the movie theater". Karen Han of Polygon called it as "a rollicking, riotously fun soundtrack, as befitting the surprisingly terrific movie." Zanobard gave a score of 6/10 and said "The musical style and compositional choices are excellent, with Jackman’s intriguing combination of traditional film-score-style orchestra with classic videogame-esque synth being a particular highlight of the album. The issue however lies in the score’s themes; there aren’t any. With the album’s rather unique and interesting musical style it badly needed a solid main theme to rally behind, and sadly it just doesn’t get one here." Filmtracks.com criticised the score, saying "it lacks the cohesive narrative and genuine heart of the far more effective Wreck-It Ralph scores, seeming like a cheap knock-off of the same environment whenever the electronics are incorporated. Those looking for robust orchestral action may be moderately intrigued by the suspense and action sequences here, but they are too few and too disjointed to merit a recommendation." CNET called Jackman's score as "catchy", while Umesh Punwani of Koimoi wrote that Jackman's "absorbing background score matches up to the dazzling visuals on screen".

Personnel 
Credits adapted from CD liner 

 Composer – Henry Jackman
 Record Producer – Henry Jackman, Maverick Dugger
 Additional Producer – Evan Goldman, Jeff Morrow, Kazuma Jinnouchi
 Bassoon – Gavin McNaughton, Rachel Simms, Richard Skinner
 Cello – Anthony Lewis, Chris Worsey, Hetty Snell, Ian Burdge, Nick Cooper, Paul Kegg, Tim Gill, Tony Wollard, Vicky Matthews, Caroline Dale
 Clarinet – Anthony Pike, Dave Fuest, Duncan Ashby, Jon Carnac
 Cor Anglais – Janey Miller
 Double Bass – Allen Walley, Andy Marshall, Richard Pryce, Steve Williams, Steve Mair, Mary Scully
 Flute – Anna Noakes, Karen Jones
 French Horn – David Pyatt, Michael Thompson, Nigel Black, Philip Eastop, Richard Berry, Richard Watkins, Simon Rayner
 Harp – Skaila Kanga
 Oboe – David Thomas, Matthew Draper, Janey Miller
 Percussion – Frank Ricotti, Gary Kettel, Paul Clarvis
 Piano – David Hartley
 Piccolo Flute – Helen Keen
 Trombone – Andy Wood, Barry Clements, Byron Fulcher, Dave Stewart, Ed Tarrant, Peter Moore, Tracey Holloway
 Trumpet – Daniel Newell, Jason Evans, Kate Moore, Philip Cobb
 Tuba, Trombone [Cimbasso] – Owen Slade
 Viola – Andy Parker, Annie Beilby, Fiona Bonds, Fiona Winning, Helen Kamminga, Julia Knight, Kate Musker, Martin Humbey, Max Baillie, Peter Lale, Reiad Chibah, Bruce White
 Violin – Alison Dods, Boguslaw Kostecki, Cathy Thompson, Clio Gould, Dai Emanuel, Daniel Bhattacharya, Emlyn Singleton, Ian Humphries, Jackie Shave, Jackie Hartley, Jenny Sacha, Marianne Haynes, Mark Berrow, Martin Burgess, Martyn Jackson, Matt Ward, Natalia Bonner, Nicky Sweeney, Ollie Heath, Oli Langford, Patrick Kiernan, Perry Montague-Mason, Richard George, Rick Koster, Roger Garland, Thom Gould, Tom Pigott-Smith, Everton Nelson, Steve Morris
 Orchestrated By – Andrew Kinney, Stephen Coleman
 Additional Orchestrations – Ed Trybek, Henri Wilkinson, Jonathan Beard
 Orchestra Leader – Everton Nelson
 Orchestra Contractor– Lucy Whalley
 Score Conductor – Gavin Greenaway
 Music Coordinator – Jane Berry
 Music Supervisor – Margaret Yen, Peter Afterman, Alison Litton
 Copyist (Music Preparation) – Jill Streator
 Pro Tools Recordist – Chris Barrett
 Music Editor – Pete 'Oso' Snell
 Score Editor – John Chapman
 Recording Engineer – Nick Wollage, Alex Ferguson, Jack Mills
 Technical Engineers – Felipe Pacheco, John Paul Lefebvre, Maverick Dugger
 Mixed By – Chris Fogel
 Legal Business Affairs – Mark Cavell
 Music Assistance – Allison Swift, Michaela Green
 Product Development – Guido Eitberger
 Music Production Services – Matthew Kusell Justmann
 Studio Manager – Alison Burton

Chart performance

Release history

References 

2019 soundtrack albums
WaterTower Music soundtracks
Sony Classical Records soundtracks
Henry Jackman soundtracks